Gene silencing pesticides are pesticides that use gene silencing, and RNA interference (RNAi) in particular to target individual species while leaving other species unharmed.

History
In 1998, it was found that double-stranded RNA, injected to worms influenced the natural gene sequence in such a way that it was silenced. Equally surprising was that the genes were also silenced when the worms ingested the dsRNA. Steven Whyard, working for CSIRO Entomology at that time, then also tried it with insects. To his surprise, this also worked, and they just invented something that had huge implications. They then patented the technology and by 2006, it was used in pesticides. Two articles were then also published that confirmed that the effect was powerful enough to protect plants from pests.

Examples 
 Monsanto and Devgen developed a gene silencing pesticide against Diabrotica virgifera
 A team, led by Xiao-Ya Chen fed gossypol with dsRNA targeting the gene for cytochrome P450 to bollworm larvae to kill them off
 Devgen has developed a gene silencing pesticide against the Colorado beetle

Application 
Besides directly killing the pests by poisoning the food of insects with RNAi, there are also other ways on how gene silencing pesticides can kill a pest. For example, a research study by Michael Scharf found that it was possible to eradicate termites by using RNAi which disables the Hex-2-gene; this transforms worker termites into soldier termites. A colony with too many soldier termites (apparently more than about 10%) does not have enough remaining worker termites to adequately feed the colony.

References 

Biopesticides
Plant toxin insecticides
Garden pests